Manolo A. Gallardo (born 13 June 1900, date of death unknown) was an Argentine boxer who competed in the 1924 Summer Olympics. In 1924 he was eliminated in the second round of the middleweight class after losing his fight to Roger Brousse.

References

External links
profile

1900 births
Year of death missing
Middleweight boxers
Olympic boxers of Argentina
Boxers at the 1924 Summer Olympics
Argentine male boxers